Pacquet ("hideaway" in French) is a town in the Canadian province of Newfoundland and Labrador. The town had a population of 164 in 2016, down from 184 in the Canada 2011 Census.

Located in White Bay, on the Baie Verte Peninsula in northeastern Newfoundland, it was surveyed in 1801 by Capt. Edgell, Edgell Island being his namesake.

It is not known for certain when Pacquet was first settled. A fishing and logging community, it is on what was once part of the French Shore, so it is likely that it was first settled by French-speaking fishermen. Pacquet (then spelled "Paquet") was a base for French seasonal fishermen from about the time of the Treaty of Utrecht in 1713, and Frenchmen continued to visit its sheltered harbour until late in the nineteenth century.  The first recorded residents were an elderly man and a young girl, who were there by 1857, probably French and probably left behind over the winter to watch over property for seasonal fishermen.  Twelve years later, two Roman Catholic families were in residence, but the population did not grow substantially until the 1880s, when the French officially left the area. In 2019, Pacquet's First United Church was destroyed by fire.

Demographics 

See also
 List of cities and towns in Newfoundland and Labrador
 CNLR 332/96 - Town of Pacquet Order under the Municipalities Act

References

Towns in Newfoundland and Labrador